Wybrany  is a village in the administrative district of Gmina Rutki, within Zambrów County, Podlaskie Voivodeship, in northeastern Poland.

References

Wybrany